SoHo is a premium entertainment channel in New Zealand available on Sky Network Television. The channel mainly broadcasts popular shows from American cable networks Showtime, AMC, Starz, HBO and FX, which are themselves not available in New Zealand. It also broadcasts shows from Britain, especially from the BBC, and also broadcasts films.

Services
There is also a SoHo channel in Australia, which launched on 20 August 2012.

A sister channel, SoHo2 launched on 7 November 2018.

SoHo2 was closed on 16 March 2021 and all the content was moved to the SoHo channel.

Content
In 2022, SoHo will distribute the Game of Thrones prequel series House of the Dragon alongside Sky's streaming service Neon.

References

External links

Television channels in New Zealand
Television channels and stations established in 2011
English-language television stations in New Zealand